The People's Freedom Movement (NSP) is a national-conservative political party in Serbia. It is led by Miroslav Parović.

History 
In December 2016, a group of members of the Third Serbia political party split from the party and formed the People's Freedom Movement with Miroslav Parović being selected as the president of the newly formed People's Freedom Movement. The president of the party, Miroslav Parović finished 11th in 2017 Serbian presidential election with 0.32% of the votes. In November 2019, the party announced that they will participate in the 2020 Serbian parliamentary election in the coalition with New Serbia.

It did not participate in the 2022 general elections, although it did held campaigns that were organized in opposition to Aleksandar Vučić.

Political platform 
People's Freedom Movement advocates a conservative ideology and it believes that only an orderly, legal state can be free and sovereign. The party advocates democratic organization and the rule of law. As anti-globalists and Euro-realists, they stand for "Europe from Lisbon to Vladivostok", with the "Paris-Berlin-Moscow axis", recognizing Belgrade as one of the cornerstones of New Europe.  They see themselves among the sovereignists, who fight for the principles of freedom, equality and solidarity, and call themselves "freemen". The party maintains good relations with similar parties in Europe. They can often be seen at events in the company of members of the National Rally from France, the Republican Party of France, the Freedom Party of Austria, and the Alternative for Germany.

Presidents of the People's Freedom Movement

Electoral performance

Parliamentary elections

Presidential elections

References 

National conservative parties
Right-wing populism in Serbia
Political parties established in 2016
Far-right parties in Europe
Far-right politics in Serbia
Nationalist parties in Serbia
Serb nationalist parties